Luoyuan County (Foochow Romanized: Lò̤-nguòng) is a county on the northeast coast of Fujian Province, China, it is under the administration of the prefecture-level city of Fuzhou, the provincial capital. The county spans an area of 1,187 square kilometers, and has a population of approximately 260,000 as of 2012.

Administrative divisions
Luoyuan County administers 6 towns, 4 townships, and 1 ethnic township.

The county's sole ethnic township is Huokou She Ethnic Township.

Climate

Transportation 
The Wenzhou–Fuzhou railway and National Highway 104 both run through the county.

References

County-level divisions of Fujian
Fuzhou